Drypetes thorelii is an Asian tree species in the family Putranjivaceae; it is named after the French botanist Clovis Thorel.

The recorded occurrence of this species is from Cambodia and Vietnam (where it may be called sang trắng Thorel).

References

External links

 Flora of Indo-China 
 Trees of Vietnam
thorelii